International Bank may refer to:

International Bank for Reconstruction and Development, an international financial institution belonging to the World Bank, formed in 1944
International Bank of Commerce, a bank in Texas, founded in 1966
International Bank (Liberia), a Liberian bank created in 1960
International Bank of Azerbaijan, a global financial institution, founded in 1992
International Bank of Qatar, a private sector bank in Qatar, founded in 1956
International Bank of Asia, a bank headquartered in Hong Kong
International Bank of Somalia, Mogadishu-based bank which began operations in 2014

See also
Awash International Bank, Ethiopian bank, founded in 1994
Basrah International Bank for Investment, Iraqi commercial bank, founded in 1993
Cairo International Bank, Ugandan bank, founded in 1995
Gulf International Bank, Bahraini bank, founded in 1975
International Westminster Bank, a subsidiary of National Westminster Bank which existed from 1913 to 1989
Persia International Bank, London-based bank which commenced trading in 2002
Xiamen International Bank, Chinese joint venture bank, established in 1985